Plymouth Argyle Football Club is an English association football club based in Plymouth, Devon. The 2010–11 season is their 108th as a professional club, their 86th as a member of the Football League and 39th in the third tier of the English football league system. The club's 23rd-place finish in the 2009–10 Championship season means they are competing in League One for the first time since 2004, when they were promoted as champions. It officially began on 1 July 2010 and ends on 30 June 2011, with competitive fixtures taking place between August and May.

Background

The 2009–10 season was the club's sixth consecutive season back in the second tier of English football, known as the Championship. It was manager Paul Sturrock's third season back at the club after returning to Home Park from Swindon Town. He was replaced by Paul Mariner in December 2009 due to poor results, which had seen the club drop into the relegation zone. Argyle were relegated with two matches still to play after a defeat at home to Newcastle United, which saw the visitors claim the league title. Yoann Folly, David McNamee, and Lloyd Saxton were released after being informed that their contracts weren't being renewed, and defender Gary Sawyer also departed. A statement in May said that the club would seek a new manager and Paul Mariner would revert to his previous role as head coach. Jamie Mackie joined Queens Park Rangers two weeks later for an undisclosed fee. Bondz N'Gala joined the club from West Ham United on a free transfer, and Rory Patterson was signed for an undisclosed fee from Glentoran, before the club confirmed Peter Reid as their new manager in June 2010.

Review

Pre-season

Midfielder Simon Walton joined Sheffield United on a season-long loan. He was followed by Ashley Barnes, who joined Brighton & Hove Albion for an undisclosed fee, and Alan Gow, who was released. The club's first pre-season friendly ended in a 2–0 win at Southern League team Truro City thanks to goals from Yannick Bolasie and Steve MacLean. This was followed by a defeat at League Two club Torquay United. The visitors took an early lead through Craig Noone, but the home side responded with goals from Lloyd Macklin, Elliot Benyon and Nicky Wroe to secure a 3–1 win. Manager Peter Reid then selected a 26-man squad to travel to the Netherlands to play three matches against Dutch opposition. Included in the squad were three trialists, including former player Tony Capaldi. A headed goal from Joe Mason gave Argyle a 1–0 victory against Eredivisie side NAC Breda. They suffered a defeat by the same scoreline against fellow Eredivisie side AZ in their next friendly. An early penalty from Nick van der Velden was the difference between the two sides in a match which saw Steve MacLean sent off in the second half.

Argyle took a three-goal lead against Eerste Divisie club SC Cambuur, but eventually had to settle for a 3–3 draw. A brace from Reza Ghoochannejhad and an equaliser from Robert van Boxel cancelled out Argyle's lead, which was given to them by Craig Noone and a brace from Joe Mason. Having featured in all of the club's pre-season matches, midfielder Anton Peterlin signed a permanent contract. Argyle won their next friendly later that day against Hereford United of League Two. Steve MacLean was on target to secure a 1–0 win for the visitors. Striker George Donnelly returned to Stockport County on a six-month loan. A penalty from Luke Summerfield earned the club a draw against Championship side Queens Park Rangers. Former player Jamie Mackie scored the equaliser for the hosts. Argyle completed their pre-season campaign with an 8–0 win against South West Peninsula League team Saltash United. Strikers Bradley Wright-Phillips and Rory Patterson both scored twice while trialist Owain Tudur-Jones, Craig Noone, Joe Mason and Curtis Nelson also found the back of the net.

August
Goalkeeper David Button joined the club on a season-long loan from Tottenham Hotspur, and defender Lee Molyneux signed a permanent contract after impressing on trial. Two other players left the club on loan. Defender Chris Barker joined Southend United for one month, and midfielder Damien Johnson signed a season-long deal with Huddersfield Town. The club started the season with a 1–0 win at Southampton. Luke Summerfield scored the winning goal in a match which was broadcast live on Sky Sports. They were knocked out of the League Cup by Notts County three days later. A second half goal from John Spicer eliminated Argyle at the first round stage for the third year in row. Midfielder Dean Parrett arrived on a season-long loan from Tottenham Hotspur. A late goal from Rory Patterson earned the club a share of the points at Home Park against Carlisle United in a 1–1 draw, having fallen behind to an Ian Harte goal. This was followed by a 2–1 defeat at Walsall. Joe Mason gave Argyle the lead, but second half goals from Paul Marshall and former player Reuben Reid won the game for the home side. Kári Árnason was shown a straight red card in stoppage time. Sean Kinsella and Jordan Trott were loaned out to Bridgwater Town for one month. Argyle were defeated 3–0 at home by Peterborough United, who scored three second-half goals thanks to strikers Craig Mackail-Smith, who scored twice, and Aaron McLean. The club completed two transfers before the summer transfer window closed. Defender Stéphane Zubar arrived from Vaslui on a free transfer, and Chris Barker joined Southend United permanently, also on a free transfer, after spending a month with them on loan.

September

Simon Walton had his season-long loan with Sheffield United cancelled after sustaining a cruciate knee ligament injury during a pre-season game. Réda Johnson scored his first goal for the club in a 1–1 draw at Colchester United. Having fallen behind to a goal from Andy Bond, the visitors equalised in the second half before Lee Molyneux was sent off for two bookable offences. Argyle won their next game 3–2 at home against Sheffield Wednesday despite being reduced to 10-men again. Captain Carl Fletcher and James O'Connor scored before Bondz N'Gala was shown a straight red card on the stroke of half time. The away side's Tommy Miller cancelled out Bradley Wright Phillips' first goal of the season before a Craig Noone header won the game. Three days later, the club suffered a 2–0 home defeat by Brighton & Hove Albion. Tommy Elphick and former player Ashley Barnes scored the goals. Bradley Wright-Phillips gave Argyle the lead at Rochdale, but the home side salvaged a 1–1 draw thanks to a goal from Craig Dawson. The club took an early two-goal lead in their next game at Swindon Town through Réda Johnson and Bradley Wright-Phillips. Swindon drew level after goals from David Prutton and Michael Rose before Prutton and Johnson were both sent off. Argyle won the game 3–2 in stoppage time thanks to a header from Wright-Phillips, giving the club their second away win of the campaign.

October
A 1–0 defeat at home to Hartlepool United followed, with Leon McSweeney scoring the winning goal late in the game. Argyle won 2–0 at Cheltenham Town in the second round of the Football League Trophy, having received a bye in the first round. Steve MacLean and Craig Noone scored the goals either side of half time. Argyle took the lead twice at home against Charlton Athletic through goals from Bradley Wright-Phillips and Yannick Bolasie before having to settle for a 2–2 draw. Striker Paul Benson scored both goals for Charlton. Liam Head joined Forest Green Rovers on loan for one month. The club were defeated 2–0 at Notts County, with Craig Westcarr and John Spicer scoring for the home side. Chelsea midfielder Conor Clifford arrived at the club on a one-month loan deal. Bradley Wright-Phillips scored twice to secure a 2–1 win at home to Huddersfield Town. The winning goal was scored after Anthony Pilkington had equalised for the visitors. Argyle played half of the game with Oldham Athletic with nine-men and looked likely to earn a point before two stoppage time goals consigned them to a 4–2 defeat. Bondz N'Gala and Kári Árnason were both sent off for the second time this season before Bradley Wright-Phillips added to Craig Noone's equaliser to give the away side the lead. Late goals from Jean-Yves Mvoto and Dean Kelly won the game for Oldham, who had scored earlier on through Dale Stephens and Oumare Tounkara.

November

Jordan Trott joined Tiverton Town on loan for one month. A volley from Dean Parrett and a brace from Bradley Wright-Phillips earned the club a 3–1 home win against Bristol Rovers. The visitors goal was scored by Will Hoskins. A 4–0 defeat by Swindon Town followed, which eliminated Argyle from the FA Cup in the first round. Sean Morrison, Charlie Austin, Vincent Péricard and Matt Ritchie scored the goals against an Argyle side which had Dean Parrett sent off on the stroke of half time. Three days later, the midfielder returned to his parent club after his season-long loan was cancelled. Argyle were then knocked out of the Football League Trophy after a 2–1 home defeat against Exeter City. A second half strike from Chris Clark cancelled out Ryan Harley's early goal before Daniel Nardiello scored the winner in stoppage time. Steve MacLean signed on loan with Oxford United for one month. A goal from Dale Jennings consigned Argyle to a 1–0 defeat at Tranmere Rovers. The loan deal for Conor Clifford from Chelsea was extended for a second month. The club suffered a fourth successive defeat at home to Brentford. Goals from Marcus Bean and Charlie MacDonald, either side of Rory Fallon's first of the season, secured a 2–1 win for the away side.

Defender Marcel Seip left the club on loan, joining Charlton Athletic until January. An early goal from striker Gavin Tomlin gave Dagenham & Redbridge the lead in the club's next game before second half goals from Craig Noone and Rory Patterson earned Argyle a 2–1 win. It was confirmed that the club had been presented with a winding-up petition from HM Revenue and Customs in October relating to unpaid tax debts. Former Leeds United and Cardiff City chairman Peter Ridsdale confirmed that he was in talks with the club regarding possible investment. "I must point out that I am not the only person in discussion with the Argyle board, there are plenty of other interested parties," he said in an interview with the BBC. "But I am certainly not in a position to announce anything at the moment as negotiations are ongoing." On the same day, Rory Fallon signed for Ipswich Town on loan until January, with a view to a permanent transfer. Midfielder Sean Kinsella signed for Stafford Rangers on loan for one month. Having not received their salaries for November, along with the playing squad, the club's staff released a statement declaring that they would do "everything they can to help the club during this difficult period."

December
Steve MacLean's loan spell with Oxford United was extended for a further month. The club's league match at Milton Keynes Dons was postponed because of a frozen pitch. Argyle were given 63 days to clear their debts with HM Revenue & Customs by a High Court judge. Ryan Leonard signed on loan with Weston-super-Mare for one month. Bradley Wright-Phillips scored two goals, either side of half time, as Argyle defeated Exeter City 2–0 in the first league meeting between the clubs since 2002. Following further wintry weather across the country, the club's next two games at Leyton Orient and Bournemouth were postponed because of frozen pitches. The club was unable to extend the loan of Conor Clifford from Chelsea when his registration was rejected by the Football League. An early goal from Stéphane Zubar was cancelled out by Lee Hughes as the club drew 1–1 with Notts County. After a week of boardroom upheaval, which included the departure of Roy Gardner as the club's chairman, Peter Ridsdale joined on a full-time basis as a football consultant. "From what I have seen the situation is precarious. No-one should underestimate the challenge that faces this club in surviving the short-term pressures," he said. "I ask everyone connected with Plymouth Argyle: the political and business communities, our creditors and anyone else who feels they can contribute to work with us." On the same day, head coach Paul Mariner was released from his contract, enabling him to pursue an opportunity abroad. "I have known Paul for a long time and working with him has been fantastic," said Peter Reid. "I'm sure he will be successful in everything he does in the future."

January

Midfielder Craig Noone joined Brighton & Hove Albion for an undisclosed fee. Lee Molyneux and Jordan Trott were released after being told that their contracts weren't being renewed. The club's first match of the new year ended in a 0–0 draw with Yeovil Town, which was the first ever league meeting between the two clubs. Defender Réda Johnson was transferred to Sheffield Wednesday for an undisclosed fee. Will Hoskins gave Bristol Rovers a two-goal lead in Argyle's next game before they responded through Bradley Wright-Phillips, Joe Mason and Stéphane Zubar to claim a 3–2 win. Peter Ridsdale confirmed that the tax debt which led to the club being presented with a winding-up petition had been paid. A 3–0 defeat by Bournemouth followed, who scored goals either side of half time through Danny Hollands, Liam Feeney and Marc Pugh. The loan deal for Sean Kinsella with Stafford Rangers was extended until the end of April. The club had two players sent off for the second time this season as they were defeated 3–2 at Huddersfield Town. Defenders Curtis Nelson and Stéphane Zubar were dismissed in a match which saw Argyle take a two-goal lead thanks to Joe Mason. The home side scored three before half time thanks to an own goal from Kári Árnason, Jordan Rhodes and Peter Clarke.

The club slipped to a 2–0 defeat at home to Oldham Athletic. Dale Stephens and Oumare Tounkara scored the goals. Onismor Bhasera scored at either end as Argyle claimed a 3–1 win at Milton Keynes Dons in the first ever match between the two sides. Kári Árnason and Chris Clark also scored for the visitors. Steve MacLean's stay on loan with Oxford United was extended until the end of the season. Argyle lost 2–0 at Charlton Athletic, with Scott Wagstaff and Nathan Eccleston on target for the home side. Top goalscorer Bradley Wright-Phillips was sold two days later, joining Charlton Athletic for an undisclosed fee. Ryan Leonard joined Tiverton Town on loan for one month. The club were defeated 2–1 at home to Bournemouth. Marc Pugh's opening goal was cancelled out by Rory Fallon before Steve Fletcher came off the bench to score the winner. Sean Kinsella had his contract terminated by mutual consent, allowing him to sign for Hibernians.

February
Argyle lost 1–0 to Yeovil Town in their first visit to Huish Park. The winning goal was scored by Andy Williams against an Argyle side which had Yannick Bolasie sent off in stoppage time. A fourth straight defeat followed at Brentford, who won 2–0 thanks to a brace from Myles Weston. A winding-up petition issued to the club in October 2010 was dismissed in the High Court after Argyle cleared their debts with HM Revenue & Customs. "Clearly there is still a long way to go for the football club. It still has a number of creditors. We ask for their patience," said Peter Ridsdale. "The club will be working tirelessly to make sure the creditors are paid in full and the club is restored to its full financial health." Joe Mason scored a late consolation in a 3–1 defeat at home to Tranmere Rovers. Lateef Elford-Alliyu scored twice and Enoch Showunmi added a third for the visitors. Having not received their wages on time for a third month, the Professional Footballers' Association confirmed that it was providing financial support to the club's players. On 21 February, the club issued a notice of intention to appoint an administrator and were immediately docked 10 points by the Football League which dropped them to the bottom of the League One table. "We are going to have to produce Championship form to stay up. It's going to be a battle, I don't mind a battle," said Peter Reid. "There are people worse off than us, we have to get on with it."

One day later, the club were defeated 4–0 at Brighton & Hove Albion. The home side were two goals ahead at half time thanks to goals from Glenn Murray and Chris Wood. Murray scored again in the second half before Francisco Sandaza added a late fourth. Ryan Leonard's loan spell with Tiverton Town was extended until the end of April. A penalty from Yannick Bolasie secured a 2–1 win over Colchester United. Rory Fallon's early goal was cancelled out by an own goal from Stéphane Zubar before Chris Clark was sent off. Bolasie's second half goal secured the club's first win in seven matches. "There will be light at the end of the tunnel," said Romain Larrieu, who made his 300th appearance for Argyle. "We all believe that. But it needs to be every game. This can't be a one-off. That's the standard now. We need to keep it there."

March

Having issued a notice of intention to appoint an administrator in February, the club officially went into administration on 4 March. Brendan Guilfoyle of P&A Partnership was appointed to run the club and search for a buyer. A brace from Joe Mason and one each from Bondz N'Gala and Yannick Bolasie earned Argyle a 4–2 win at Sheffield Wednesday. Giles Coke and former player Réda Johnson scored for the home side. Argyle moved off the bottom of the League One table after winning their third match in a row. They were replaced by Swindon Town, who they defeated 1–0 at home. The winning goal was scored by Rory Fallon in the tenth minute. The club's run of wins came to an end at Hartlepool United as Antony Sweeney and Sam Collins scored either side of half time in a 2–0 win for the home side. A late goal from Yannick Bolasie earned Argyle a 1–1 draw at Carlisle United, who had taken the lead in the first half through James Berrett.

As negotiations continued with potential buyers, the club's players, staff and management agreed to defer their wages for March and April until a deal was struck. "If it helps the football club to stay in existence it's not a problem. The future of Plymouth Argyle is the most important thing," said Peter Reid. "I feel for them [the office staff]. Some of the sacrifices they are having to make are incredible. But the spirit among the staff is brilliant." A second half goal from Gary Jones saw Argyle return to the foot on the table as they lost 1–0 at home to Rochdale. The club's match at home to Southampton was rearranged for 2 May due to international call-ups involving Onismor Bhasera, Rory Fallon and Joe Mason.

April
Early goals from Scott McGleish and Dean Cox saw Argyle fall nine points adrift of safety after a 2–0 defeat at Leyton Orient. The club secured their first win in five games against Walsall on 9 April at Home Park. Yannick Bolasie and Rory Patterson scored in a 2–0 win. On 16 April, Argyle took on Peterborough United at London Road. The away side led at half time thanks to a goal from captain Carl Fletcher in the 38th minute. Peterborough equalised ten minutes into the second half through Ryan Bennett before Craig Mackail-Smith won the game 2–1 for the hosts. Argyle moved off the bottom of the table on 22 April after a 1–0 win at Dagenham & Redbridge. The decisive goal was scored by Rory Patterson, who converted a 25-yard free-kick in the 48th minute. Patterson was sent off late in the game for a second bookable offence. Three days later, a goal from Simon Walton earned a 1–0 win at home against Milton Keynes Dons. A 1–0 defeat at Exeter City on 30 April meant Argyle needed to win their last two matches of the season to have a chance of avoiding relegation. James Dunne's first goal of the campaign earned all three points for the home side.

May
On 2 May, Argyle were relegated to League Two after a 3–1 defeat at home to Southampton, with 13,118 in attendance. Rickie Lambert gave the visitors the lead just before half time and they increased their lead soon after the restart through former Argyle player Ryan Dickson. Lambert scored his second goal of the game from the penalty spot before Yannick Bolasie scored a consolation goal in stoppage time. The club's last game of the season was on 7 May and they were defeated 4–1 at Home Park. Goals from Scott McGleish and Dean Cox gave the visitors a two-goal lead at half time. Yannick Bolasie reduced the deficit after 63 minutes, but two further goals from Alex Revell ensured that Argyle finished 23rd in the table.

Match results

League One

FA Cup

League Cup

League Trophy

League table

Player details

Updated to games played on 7 May 2011.
Source: Official website, Soccerbase, ESPNsoccernet
Apps = Appearances made; Goals = Goals scored.

Transfers

In

Out

Loans in

Loans out

See also
List of Plymouth Argyle F.C. seasons

References

External links

2010-11
2010–11 Football League One by team